The seventeenth edition of the South American Championship was held in Montevideo, Uruguay from 10 January to 7 February.

For the first time seven teams took part of the event; the participating countries were Argentina, Brazil, Chile, Ecuador, Paraguay, Peru, and Uruguay.

Bolivia, and Colombia withdrew from the tournament.

The tournament featured a match between Argentina and Ecuador in which Argentina's José Manuel Moreno surpassed the 500-goal mark for goals in Copa América history, scoring 5 in a 12–0 drubbing of Ecuador. , the 12-goal difference of that match remains the widest ever in Copa Américas. José Manuel Moreno and Herminio Masantonio of Argentina were joint top scorers of the tournament, with 7 goals each.

Squads

Venues

Final round 
Each team played against each of the other teams. Two points were awarded for a win, one point for a draw and no (0) points for a defeat.

Chile left the pitch on the 43rd minute in protest of the dreadful referee performance. 
Argentina was awarded a victory but with no goals.

Result

Goal scorers 

7 goals

  Herminio Masantonio
  José Manuel Moreno

6 goals
  Sylvio Pirillo

5 goals

  Roberto Porta
  Severino Varela

3 goals

  Marcial Barrios
  Fabio Baudo Franco
  Luis Castro
  Bibiano Zapirain

2 goals

  Enrique García
  Ángel Perucca
  Pedro Amorim
  Rodolfo Barteczko
  Zizinho
  Alfonso Domínguez
  José María Jiménez
  Ruben Aveiro
  Teodoro Fernández
  Anibal Ciocca

1 goal

  Juan Carlos Heredia
  Adolfo Pedernera
  Sandoval
  Cláudio
  Servílio
  Tim
  Benito Armingol
  Armando Contreras
  Marino Alcívar
  Enrique Alvarez
  Gorgonio Ibarrola
  Eduardo Mingo
  Vicente Sánchez
  Luis Guzmán
  Quiñónez
  Magallanes
  Chirimini
  Schubert Gambetta
  Obdulio Varela

External links 

 South American Championship 1942 at RSSSF

1942
1942
1942 in South American football
1942 in Argentine football
1942 in Brazilian football
1942 in Uruguayan football
1942 in Peruvian football
1942 in Paraguayan football
1942 in Chilean sport
1942 in Ecuador
January 1942 sports events
February 1942 sports events
Sports competitions in Montevideo
1940s in Montevideo